Anchal is a developing town located in the centre of Kollam district in Kerala, India.

Etymology
There are a number of different legends about the origin of the name Anchal. One legend is that there used to be an "Anchalappis" at the site of the present range office junction, from which the name "Anchal" originates. Another legend is how five disputes evolved in the region, leading to the name of the land of five disputes, proverbs or puzzles.  A third legend is that the five Banyan trees or "Aal" in the region, are the origin the name Anchal, a portmanteau of Anch meaning five and Aal meaning Banyan tree.

Transport 
The nearest railway stations are the Punalur Railway Station and the Kollam Junction Railway Station, located respectively 14 km and 38 km away. Kollam Junction is the second largest railway station in Kerala by area and is also one of the oldest. Punalur Railway Station is about 11 km from Anchal and currently connects to Kollam, Thiruvananthapuram, Kottayam, Ernakulam, Thrissur, Palakkad, Nagarcoil, Kanyakumari, Tirunelveli and Madurai. The nearest International Airport is Trivandrum International Airport, located 55 km from Anchal in the city of Thiruvananthapuram. It is the main international airport in the state of Kerala and offers both national and international flights. Anchal is located between the National Highway 744 and the Main Central Road and Hilly highway  is also passing through Anchal. Multiple bus services also run between Anchal and other places in Kerala.

Demographics 

In the 2011 Census of India, Anchal had a population of 33,098 of which 15,732 are male and 17,356 are female. The literacy rate is 95%, with 96.7% of males literate and 93.49% of females literate. The total employed population is 11,960. 71% of the population that are employed are male and 29% are female.

Notable people 

 Rajiv Anchal - a film director, screenwriter, and sculptor who works in Malayalam language cinema
 B. Kemal Pasha - a retired judge of the high court of Kerala
 Resul Pookutty - Academy Award winning Sound Engineer

References

Villages in Kollam district